Dwayne Francis Lamb (born 20 December 1961) is a former Australian rules footballer who played with West Coast in the Victorian Football League (VFL) (Australian Football League (AFL) from 1990) and  in the West Australian Football League (WAFL). A utility player, he was often used as a ruck rover or in defence.

Playing career
Lamb began his junior playing career for North Innaloo before joining . He made his league debut in round 2 of the 1980 WAFL season, becoming a regular league player the following season. At the time Subiaco were the league's chopping block, but Lamb quickly established himself in the team and by 1982 – a season when the Lions were on track for a win less season before beating East Fremantle in their seventeenth match – Lamb's tough but unspectacular style won Subiaco's best and fairest award, an achievement repeated in 1984 when under legendary coach Haydn Bunton, Jr., Subiaco finally took steps away from the WAFL cellar.

In 1986, Lamb played in Subiaco's premiership-winning team, kicking two early goals and being part of an on-ball brigade that defeated the Sharks in the Grand Final. Consequently, Lamb made his VFL debut in West Coast's inaugural side in 1987, and became the first player to reach 50, 100 and 150 games for the Eagles. In 1991 against Geelong Football Club, Lamb was knocked out in a sling tackle, which resulted in him swallowing his tongue and his airway being blocked. His airway was opened up by a Geelong trainer with an oropharyngeal airway before he was taken off on a stretcher. Lamb played in West Coast's premiership team in 1992. However, in 1993 Lamb's form declined so much that by 1994 he played only five AFL games and returned to the WAFL, where he played his 300th match of senior football and his 150th with Subiaco in consecutive weeks at the end of the home-and-away season.

In 1996 Lamb was named in the Eagles' official "Team of the Decade". He was named in the Western Australian Football Hall of Fame in 2010.

References

External links

1961 births
Living people
West Coast Eagles players
West Coast Eagles Premiership players
Western Australian State of Origin players
Subiaco Football Club players
West Australian Football Hall of Fame inductees
Australian rules footballers from Perth, Western Australia
One-time VFL/AFL Premiership players